

Events 
Asprilio Pacelli is appointed  of St Peter's Basilica

Publications 
February – Giulio Caccini –  <ref>Le nuove musiche was published in 1602 per the Gregorian calendar. Some sources list 1601, based on the Julian calendar, as the publication date.</ref> (The New Music), published in Florence
Agostino Agazzari – , book 1 (Rome: Aloysio Zannetti)
Felice Anerio
Second book of madrigals for six voices (Rome: Luigi Zannetti)
Giammateo Asola
 (Vespertine psalms for all solemnities) for three voices (Venice: Ricciardo Amadino), also includes a Magnificat, Salve Regina, and Regina caeli
 (Vespertine hymns for the major solemnities of the year) for eight voices (two choirs) (Venice: Ricciardo Amadino)
Lamentations for six voices (Venice: Ricciardo Amadino)
Ippolito Baccusi –  for five voices (Venice: Ricciardo Amadino)
Giovanni Bassano – First book of madrigals and canzonettas for soprano or bass voice with lute or other plucked instrument (Venice: Giacomo Vincenti)
Lodovico Bellanda – First book of madrigals for five voices (Venice: Ricciardo Amadino)
Aurelio Bonelli – First book of ricercars and canzonas for four voices (Venice: Angelo Gardano)
Christoph Demantius –  for four, five, and six voices and instruments (Nuremberg: Catharina Dieterich for Konrad Agricola), a collection of music for Vespers
Scipione Dentice – Fourth book of madrigals for five voices (Naples: Antonio Pace)
Stefano Felis – Ninth book of madrigals for five voices (Venice: Giacomo Vincenti)
Melchior Franck
 for four voices (Nuremberg: Konrad Baur), a collection of secular partsongs
 for six voices (Nuremberg: Katharina Dieterich), a collection of secular partsongs
 for four voices (Nurember: Konrad Baur), a collection of psalms and other church songs in German
Marco da Gagliano – First book of madrigals for five voices (Venice: Angelo Gardano)
Bartholomäus Gesius –  for six voices (Frankfurt an der Oder: Friedrich Hartmann), a song in praise of Music
Pierre Guédron –  for four and five voices (Paris: Ballard)
Claude Le Jeune – First book of psalms for three voices (Paris: widow of R. Ballard)
Alonso Lobo – First book of masses (Madrid: Joannes Flandre)
Duarte Lobo –  for four and eight voices (Antwerp: Plantin), a collection of liturgical music
Tomaso Pecci – Madrigals for five voices (Venice: Angelo Gardano), also contains two pieces by Mariano Tantucci
Andreas Pevernage – Masses for five, six, and seven voices (Antwerp: Pierre Phalèse), published posthumously
Costanzo Porta –  for four voices (Venice: Angelo Gardano), a collection of hymns for the whole year
Hieronymus Praetorius – Magnificats for eight voices (Hamburg: Philip von Ohr)
Orfeo Vecchi
Third book of masses for five voices (Milan: Agostino Tradate)
 (Milan: the heirs of Simon Tini & Giovanni Francesco Besozzi), a madrigal cycle
Lodovico Grossi da Viadana – Cento concerti ecclesiastici (One Hundred Church Concertos), the first major publication to make extensive use of figured bass

 Opera 
Giulio Caccini – Euridice (not the same as the 1600 opera of the same name by Jacopo Peri, to which Caccini contributed some of the music)

 Births 
February 14 – Francesco Cavalli, Italian composer (died 1676)
April – William Lawes, English composer (died 1645)probable'' – Chiara Margarita Cozzolani, Italian composer (died 1678)

Deaths 
January 6 – Andreas Raselius, German composer (born c. 1563)
March 11 – Emilio de' Cavalieri, Italian composer (born c. 1563)
October – Thomas Morley, English composer, music theorist and publisher (born c. 1557)
November 29 – Anthony Holborne, English composer (born c. 1545)

Notes

 
17th century in music
Music by year